The Rock of Eternity is a fictional location appearing in American comic books featuring Captain Marvel / Shazam and/or his associated characters, first in publications by Fawcett Comics and later by DC Comics. 

In many versions of the Captain Marvel / Shazam! franchise, the Rock of Eternity is a cavern at the end of an abandoned subway tunnel which serves as the source of the character's power as the residence of his benefactor, the wizard Shazam – as well as seven statues representing the Seven Deadly Enemies of Man, which the keeper(s) of the Shazam power are tasked with watching and protecting humanity against.

It first appears in The Marvel Family #1 (December 1945). Issue #7 (December 1947) further explores the Rock of Eternity in the story "The Marvel Family Reaches Eternity".

The Rock of Eternity appeared in the 2019 film Shazam!, set in the DC Extended Universe.

Fictional location history
In the context of the original Fawcett stories published from 1940 to 1953, the Rock of Eternity is the lair of the Wizard Shazam, the ancient Egyptian mage who grants Captain Marvel and his Marvel Family associates Mary Marvel and Captain Marvel, Jr. with their powers. Resembling a large, barren mountain and positioned at the center of space and time, the wizard's spirit remained at the Rock after his death during the initial creation of Captain Marvel, as depicted in Whiz Comics #2 (February 1940). He had previously lived in an underground lair on Earth, accessible by a magic subway car; the lair included his throne and imprisoned stone personifications of the Seven Deadly Enemies of Man. Following the wizard's death, lighting the brazier in the underground lair would summon Shazam's spirit from the Rock of Eternity; alternately, the Marvels could choose to journey to the Rock itself by flying faster than the speed of light. Surrounding the Rock were mists representing space and time; navigating through them could allow the Marvels to travel to specific locations in time and space.

After a lawsuit from DC Comics forced Fawcett Comics to cease publication of all Captain Marvel-related material in 1953, DC later elected to license the Captain Marvel properties from Fawcett. The Rock of Eternity is used as a locale in some of the 1970s-1980s DC Captain Marvel stories - published under the title Shazam! due to trademark issues with a "Captain Marvel" character that was published by Marvel Comics after Fawcett's Captain Marvel was out of publication. As it is located at the center of space and time in these stories, the Rock allowed the Marvels and other DC Characters to travel between the various dimensions of DC's Multiverse and travel to the company's various super-hero characters' alternate worlds. The wizard's enemies were aware of the rock's existence, which lead to Mr. Mind leading an incarnation of the Monster Society of Evil to attempt to destroy it through direct assault, only to be defeated by the Marvel Family defending it.

A 1994 reboot of Captain Marvel by Jerry Ordway under the title The Power of Shazam! featured prominent usage of The Rock of Eternity, merging it and Shazam's earthly underground lair so that the Seven Deadly Enemies of Man (later referred to by the more common Seven Deadly Sins) were now imprisoned at the Rock of Eternity along with many other demons captured by the Wizard Shazam. The Marvels now gained access to the Rock by using the subway car or by magic teleportation. The Rock of Eternity now resembled a giant stone diamond suspended in the middle of the mists of space and time; in one Power of Shazam! story, it was relayed as having been formed by the Wizard Shazam under his original persona as The Champion, the civilized world's first superhero, by taking a piece of stone from heaven and a mating slab from hell. A 2005 comic book miniseries, Day of Vengeance, features the Spectre destroying the spirit of the Wizard Shazam, causing the Rock to lose its tether outside of space and time and explode over Gotham City, freeing the Sins and other evils. A follow-up Day of Vengeance Special features Captain Marvel and a number of other magic-based superheroes reforming the Rock.

Geoff Johns & Gary Frank's 2012-13 Shazam! reboot, printed as backups in the Justice League (vol. 2) series, revamped the origin and purpose of The Rock of Eternity for DC's New 52 continuity. In this revised setup, the Rock was a magical palace atop a mountain visible as a locale several millennia ago in the ancient North African kingdom of Kahndaq. A council of seven Wizards ruled over all earthly magic from the Rock, dispatching champions to serve them on Earth by harnessing their powers. Black Adam, the champion of Council of Eternity lead wizard Shazam, went rogue and killed the other Wizards, leading Shazam to imprison Adam and hide the Rock and all magic from the world. With Adam's release by Doctor Sivana in the present day, a wizened and dying Shazam appointed teenager Billy Batson as the successor to his powers and his title as leader of the Council of Wizards.

In the 2017-2018 series Dark Nights: Metal, Wonder Woman, Hawkgirl and Doctor Fate travel to the Rock of Eternity searching for the Nth metal that forms Hawkman's mace. There they face the Seven Deadly Sins and Black Adam, and the latter instantly kills Doctor Fate.

In the third volume of Shazam!, it is revealed that the Rock of Eternity has a train station that can access the seven Magiclands.

During the "Dark Nights: Death Metal" storyline, the Rock of Eternity fell into Fawcett City when The Batman Who Laughs remade Earth into his vision. This led to the Seven Deadly Enemies of Man being freed.

In other media

Television
 The Rock of Eternity appears in The Kid Super Power Hour with Shazam! episode "Black Adam's Return".
 The Rock of Eternity appears in the Batman: The Brave and the Bold episode "The Power of Shazam!".
 The Rock of Eternity appears in the Justice League Action episode "Classic Rock".
 The Rock of Eternity is seen in the Teen Titans Go! episode "Little Elvis".

Film
 The Rock of Eternity is seen in Superman/Shazam!: The Return of Black Adam.
 The Rock of Eternity is seen in Lego DC Super Hero Girls: Super-Villain High.

DC Extended Universe
 The Rock of Eternity appears in the 2019 film Shazam!, set in the DC Extended Universe. In the film, the Wizard Shazam elaborates it is where all magic in the universe originates. It is also where he gives Billy Batson his powers, and where the statues imprisoning the Seven Deadly Sins, the Eye of Sin, and the terrarium holding Mister Mind are kept. It is also revealed that years prior, a young Thaddeus Sivana had been brought to the Rock of Eternity by the wizard Shazam being chosen, but due to being attracted by the Eye of Sin, is rejected by the wizard. Billy, as the superhero Shazam, is later coerced by Sivana to return to the Rock when the latter blackmails him into transferring his powers, but is interrupted by his foster siblings, who help him escape back to Philadelphia, where he shares his powers with them instead of Sivana, allowing them to defeat him and the Sins. The foster siblings return to the Rock in their superhero forms, where Billy returns the Eye and the Sins to captivity, and the siblings, particularly Freddy Freeman, happily decide to make the Rock their new "hangout". In a deleted scene, the six heroes proceed to sit on six thrones before noticing that there is an empty seventh throne.
 The Rock of Eternity later appears in the 2022 film Black Adam. In ancient Kahndaq, Teth-Adam's son Hurut is chosen by the Council of the Wizards to be their champion due to his heroic deeds against the tyrannical king Ahk-Ton. The wizards whisk Hurut away from the site of his public execution to the Rock, where they empower him. The king's henchmen subsequently attack Hurut's parents, killing his mother Shiruta and leaving Teth-Adam gravely injured. Hurut transfers his powers to his father, saving Teth-Adam's life at the cost of his own as the de-powered Hurut is then killed by the king's men. Teth-Adam, enraged at his son's death, uses his new powers to slaughter the king and his men, which also winds up killing millions. Because of this, the wizards fight and imprison Teth-Adam, with most of them dying in the fight except Shazam. Teth-Adam is awakened 5,000 years later in the present by Adrianna Tomaz to protect herself and her colleagues from the Intergang, as she seeks to hide the Crown of Sabbac from the criminal organization. In the film, fragments of the Rock of Eternity are called "Eternium" and are used to create the Crown of Sabbac and high-tech vehicles and weapons used by Intergang. Eternium is also shown to weaken Teth-Adam in a similar fashion to kryptonite's effect on Superman.
 The Rock of Eternity appeared in the 2023 film Shazam! Fury of the Gods. In the flim, Billy and his brothers have redecorated the Rock with lights, they have also put all the necessities and comforts that they want.

Video games
 The Rock of Eternity appears in Injustice 2.
 The Rock of Eternity is mentioned in Lego DC Super-Villains. Black Adam sends Shazam and Mazahs there.

Notes

References

1945 comics debuts
Fictional elements introduced in 1945
Marvel Family
DC Comics locations
Captain Marvel (DC Comics)
Fictional caves